The Blackfoot LDS Tabernacle, also known as the Blackfoot Tabernacle or South Blackfoot Stake Tabernacle is a building located in Blackfoot, Idaho that formerly served as a tabernacle for large gatherings of members of the Church of Jesus Christ of Latter-day Saints (LDS Church). The tabernacle was designed by architects Hyrum Pope and Harold W. Burton and completed in 1921.  The building was listed on the National Register of Historic Places in 1977.  In 1980 the church sold the building to the city of Blackfoot. It was used as a civic auditorium until the 90's and sat until 2003. In 2003 local business owner Perry Hawker bought it and it now functions as the Hawker Funeral Home.

References

See also

 List of National Historic Landmarks in Idaho
 National Register of Historic Places listings in Bingham County, Idaho

20th-century Latter Day Saint church buildings
Buildings and structures in Bingham County, Idaho
Former churches in Idaho
Former Latter Day Saint religious buildings and structures
Churches on the National Register of Historic Places in Idaho
Churches completed in 1921
Tabernacles (LDS Church)
National Register of Historic Places in Bingham County, Idaho
Blackfoot, Idaho